, is an area consisting of open greenland in Fukushima, Tochigi, Gunma and Niigata Prefectures in Japan. The park is 372 km² in area and is the 29th national park in Japan.

Opened on 30 August 2007, the park's area includes the marshes (Ozegahara) and the mountains in the Oze area, formerly part of the Nikkō National Park, and other nearby areas including the Aizu-Komagatake and Tashiroyama mountains.

The park was the first new national park to open in 20 years, since the designation of Hokkaidō's Kushiro wetlands as a national park in 1987.

In Gunma's Jomo Karuta, Oze National Park is featured on the 'se' card.

See also
List of national parks of Japan
Mount Aizu-Komagatake
Sanjō Falls
Mount Hiuchigatake

References

External links 

 The Oze Preservation Foundation english website
 

National parks of Japan
Protected areas established in 2007
Parks and gardens in Fukushima Prefecture
Parks and gardens in Tochigi Prefecture
Parks and gardens in Gunma Prefecture
Parks and gardens in Niigata Prefecture
Ramsar sites in Japan